Arsim Abazi (born 28 November 1972) is a Kosovan professional football coach and former player who is the current manager of the Kosovo national under-17 team.

Club career
In 1997, Abazi was transferred to Macedonian First Football League club Sloga Jugomagnat and appeared 22 times and scored one goal, he besides being was part of Sloga Jugomagnat, he was part even of Macedonian First Football League rivals Vardar (2000–2001) and Malatyaspor (2001–2003). While, in the last five years of his career he returns to her homeland and joined with Football Superleague of Kosovo club Ferizaj.

International career
On 7 September 2002, Abazi made his debut with Kosovo in a friendly match against Albania after being named in the starting line-up. He was subsequently called up for KTFF 50th Anniversary Cup, held in Northern Cyprus, and played in both tournament matches against host Northern Cyprus as starter and Sápmi as substitute.

References

External links

1972 births
Living people
People from Ferizaj
Kosovan men's footballers
Kosovo pre-2014 international footballers
Kosovan expatriate footballers
Expatriate footballers in North Macedonia
Kosovan expatriate sportspeople in North Macedonia
Expatriate footballers in Turkey
Kosovan expatriate sportspeople in Turkey
Association football defenders
Macedonian First Football League players
FK Sloga Jugomagnat players
FK Vardar players
Süper Lig players
Malatyaspor footballers
Football Superleague of Kosovo players
KF Ferizaj players
Kosovan football managers
KF Trepça '89 managers
KF Ferizaj managers